Violet Tendencies is a 2010 romantic comedy film directed by Casper Andreas, written by Jesse Archer, and starring Mindy Cohn and Marcus Patrick. The film was released in the United States on November 19, 2010, and came out on video on demand in March 2011 and DVD on May 24, 2011.

Premise
Violet (Cohn) is forty, fabulous, and the ultimate fag hag. Fed up with being single, she decides to distance herself from her gay friends in order to find a straight boyfriend.

Cast

References

External links
 Violet Tendencies official website
 

2010 films
2010 romantic comedy films
American romantic comedy films
American LGBT-related films
American independent films
2010 independent films
2010 LGBT-related films
2010s English-language films
2010s American films
LGBT-related romantic comedy films